Dansketinden is the highest mountain in the Stauning Alps range, Eastern Greenland.

Geography
Dansketinden rises 15 km east of the shore of the Alpefjord —a branch of the Segelsällskapet Fjord, between the heads of Viking Glacier (Vikingebrae), Gully Glacier and Bersaerkerbrae glaciers.

Climbing history
Dansketinden was first climbed by Swiss mountaineers John Haller (1927–1984), Wolfgang Diehl (1908–1990) and Fritz Schwarzenbach on 5 August 1954. The second ascent was made by a 1964 expedition led by Guido Monzino.

See also
List of mountain peaks of Greenland
List of mountains in Greenland
List of the ultra-prominent summits of North America
List of the major 100-kilometer summits of North America
Norsketinden

References

External links
Caledonian orogen of East Greenland 70°N–82°N 

Stauning Alps
Mountains of Greenland